HD 164427 is a star with a brown dwarf companion in the southern constellation of Pavo. It has an apparent visual magnitude of 6.88, placing it just below the nominal limit for visibility with the typical naked eye. The annual parallax shift of  yields a distance estimate of 42.6 light years. It is moving further from the Earth with a heliocentric radial velocity of +3.4 km/s.

This is an inactive G-type main-sequence star given a stellar classification of G0+V by Gray et al. (2006), although Evans et al. (1964) classified it as a subgiant star with luminosity class IV. It is 6.6 billion years old with 1.125 times the mass of the Sun and 1.40 times the Sun's radius. The star is somewhat over-luminous for its class, radiating 2.33 times the Sun's luminosity from its photosphere at an effective temperature of 5,876 K.

In 2001, a brown dwarf candidate companion was announced by Anglo-Australian Planet Search program. It was detected by the Doppler velocity technique with an echelle spectrograph attached to the 3.92m Anglo-Australian Telescope. A magnitude 12.60 companion star designated  lies at an angular separation of  along a position angle of 336°, as of 2010.



HD 164427 b 

HD 164427 b is a brown dwarf with a minimum mass of 46 times that of Jupiter. It orbits at nearly half an astronomical unit or Earth-to-Sun distance away from its star (HD 164427). The angular separation between the brown dwarf and the yellow dwarf as viewed from Earth is 11.76 milliarcseconds. It takes 108.55 Earth days to orbit eccentrically around HD 164427. It has a very high semi-amplitude of almost 1400 m/s, because this is a very massive object which exerts strong gravitational pull on its tugging star.

References

External links 
 

G-type main-sequence stars
Brown dwarfs
Pavo (constellation)
Durchmusterung objects
0700
164427
088531